William Owen (1906 – after 1930) was an English professional footballer who played in the Football League for Birmingham and Coventry City. He played as a goalkeeper.

Owen was born in Coventry. He joined Birmingham from Nuneaton Borough in April 1926. He made his debut in the First Division on 15 January 1927 in a 3–2 defeat at Burnley, the first of a run of six games in which he deputised for Dan Tremelling. Once Tremelling became available again, Owen returned to the reserves. He moved on to Fulham and Coventry City, for whom he played five Third Division South games in the 1930–31 season before returning to non-league football with former club Nuneaton and with Stourbridge.

Notes

References

1906 births
Year of death missing
Footballers from Coventry
English footballers
Association football goalkeepers
Nuneaton Borough F.C. players
Birmingham City F.C. players
Fulham F.C. players
Coventry City F.C. players
Stourbridge F.C. players
English Football League players
Date of birth missing
Place of death missing